Central Reservations is the third compilation released by Grand Central Records. It was released in September 1997 and consists of outtakes and remixes from the Central Heating compilation and Tony D's Pound For Pound album.

Track listing
 "Phantasm" (Original mix) - Aim  – 6:12 
 "Pourquoi" (Only Child Meets Rae & Christian On Tib St. mix) - Only Child  – 5:41
 "Don't Want To Lose You" (Chris Jam mix) - Tony D  – 5:36 
 "Walk Like A Man" (featuring Lorna Harris) (Hidden Agenda mix) - Tony D  – 6:07 
 "Through These Veins" - Funky Fresh Few  – 4:02 
 "Is It Worth It?" (featuring Spikey T) (Manasseh Dub) - Mr. Scruff  – 4:18 
 "Spellbound" (Dub instrumental) - Rae & Christian  – 5:26 
 "Jersey MC'S" (featuring Low Key)- Tony D  – 4:42 
 "Queen Of My Dreams" - Tony D  – 4:09 
 "Don't Want To Lose You" (featuring Veba) (Unsung Heroes mix) - Tony D   – 5:13
 "Blind Mice" - Andy Votel  – 4:27 
 "Rain" (featuring Buffy Brox) (Rhodes & Sax A cappella mix) - Only Child  – 3:34

See also
 Grand Central Records compilations

1998 compilation albums
Grand Central Records compilation albums
Hip hop compilation albums
Electronica compilation albums